Peter Andersen may refer to:

People
 DQ (singer) (born 1973), Danish singer born Peter Andersen
 Peter Andersen (curler, born 1993), Canadian-Kosovan curler
 Peter Andersen (Danish curler) (born 1957), Danish curler
 Peter Andersen (gymnast) (1884–1956), Danish Olympic gymnast
 Peter S. Andersen (1871–1948)
 Peter Marius Andersen (1885–1972), Danish footballer
 Peter Andersen (industrialist) (1834–1887), Danish industrialist
 Peter Riis Andersen (born 1980), Danish cyclist

Other
 Peter Andersen (film), 1941 Danish film

See also
Peter Andersson (disambiguation)

Andersen, Peter